Federal Corners is a former hamlet located in the Town of Richfield, New York, in Otsego County, United States, approximately 1.5 miles southeast of the village of Richfield Springs, at the corner of Butternut Road and Cemetery Road.

Federal Corners "lay near the intersection of an old route from the Mohawk Valley to Canadarago Lake and the Third Great Western Turnpike, opened in 1808". Most above-ground remains of the hamlet have disappeared, since "its economy failed by the early 1840s".

History
According to a 19th-century history of the area, 

The Lemuel F. Vibber House, constructed about 1810 in Federal Corners and still standing, is listed in the National Register of Historic Places.

References

Hamlets in Otsego County, New York